Agelasta imogenae is a species of beetle in the family Cerambycidae. It was described by Karl-Ernst Hüdepohl in 1985. It is known from the Philippines.

References

imogenae
Beetles described in 1985